Daria Pikulik (born 6 January 1997) is a Polish professional track cyclist. She rode in the women's team pursuit at the 2016 UCI Track Cycling World Championships. Her sister, Wiktoria, is also a professional cyclist.

Major results

2015
1st Points Race, Grand Prix of Poland
2016
 1st Omnium, Prova Internacional de Anadia
Grand Prix Galichyna
1st Omnium
2nd Individual Pursuit
UEC U23 European Championships 
2nd  Individual Pursuit
3rd  Team Pursuit (with Monika Graczewska, Justyna Kaczkowska and Łucja Pietrzak)
Grand Prix of Poland
2nd Team Pursuit (with Monika Graczewska, Justyna Kaczkowska and Łucja Pietrzak)
2nd Omnium
2017
3rd Omnium, Grand Prix Favorit Brno
2020
3rd  Omnium, UCI Track Cycling World Championships

2023
1st Stage 1 Tour Down Under

References

External links

1997 births
Living people
Polish female cyclists
People from Skarżysko County
Polish track cyclists
Olympic cyclists of Poland
Cyclists at the 2016 Summer Olympics
Cyclists at the 2020 Summer Olympics
21st-century Polish women